Alprenolol, or alfeprol, alpheprol, and alprenololum (Gubernal, Regletin, Yobir, Apllobal, Aptine, Aptol Duriles), is a non-selective beta blocker as well as a 5-HT1A and 5-HT1B receptor antagonist, used in the treatment of angina pectoris. It is no longer marketed by AstraZeneca, but may still be available from other pharmaceutical companies or generically.

References

5-HT1A antagonists
5-HT1B antagonists
N-isopropyl-phenoxypropanolamines
AstraZeneca brands
Allyl compounds
Beta blockers